Tokarski (feminine Tokarska) is a Polish surname, it may refer to:
 Dustin Tokarski (born 1989), Canadian ice hockey player
 Genowefa Tokarska (born 1949), Polish politician
 Joanna Tokarska-Bakir (born 1958), Polish cultural anthropologist
 Maja Tokarska (born 1991), Polish volleyball player
 Piotr Tokarski, Polish actor

See also
 
 

Polish-language surnames